Shockaloo Creek is a stream in the U.S. state of Mississippi.

Shockaloo is a name derived from the Choctaw language meaning "cypress tree". Variant names are "Schock Creek" and "Shockaloe Creek".

References

Rivers of Mississippi
Rivers of Leake County, Mississippi
Rivers of Scott County, Mississippi
Mississippi placenames of Native American origin